The Church of the Intercession of the Holy Virgin in Knin is a Serbian Orthodox Church in Šibenik-Knin County, Croatia. The church was built in the neo-Byzantine style in the 18th century.

See also
 List of Serbian Orthodox churches in Croatia

References

Churches completed in 1971
Serbian Orthodox church buildings in Croatia
Buildings and structures in Šibenik-Knin County
Neo-Byzantine architecture
20th-century Serbian Orthodox church buildings
Knin
20th-century churches in Croatia